London Daze is the sixth album by Spiders & Snakes, released by Cleopatra Records in 2000. The album features rerecordings of songs that were recorded or played by frontman Lizzie Grey's previous band London.

The album's most successful track was the rerecording of "Public Enemy #1", which was also recorded by Mötley Crüe and released on their debut album Too Fast For Love (1981). According to Grey, the track received "a great deal of airplay both domestically and international[ly]."

London Daze also includes three tracks from a 16-track demo recorded by London in 1980 featuring ex-Mott the Hoople vocalist Nigel Benjamin on vocals and Mötley Crüe bassist Nikki Sixx on bass.

Track listing

Spiders & Snakes
 "London Daze"
 "Nonstop Rock" (London cover)
 "Party in Hollywood" (London cover)
 "Radio Stars" (London cover)
 "Don't Know When to Stop"
 "Public Enemy #1" (Mötley Crüe cover)
 "Run, Run, Run" (Jo Jo Gunne cover)
 "Elvis' TV"
 "Rock and Roll Queen" (Mott the Hoople cover)
 "2000 Rock & Roll"

London
 "Nobody Loves You Like I Do"
 "Straight From the Heart"
"Dream Girl"

Band members

Spiders & Snakes
Lizzie Grey - vocal, guitar
Doug E. Sex - guitar
Leigh Lawson - bass
Timothy Jay - drums

London
Nigel Benjamin - lead vocals
Lizzie Grey - guitar
Nikki Sixx - bass
John St. John - keyboards
Dane Rage - drums

References 

2000 albums